Edgar Duran (born May 31, 1996) is an American soccer player who currently plays for Real Monarchs in the USL.

Career
Duran signed with United Soccer League side Real Monarchs out of the Real Salt Lake academy in August 2015. He had a short spell on loan with Premier Development League side Kitsap Pumas, who he joined on March 31, 2016.

References

External links
 

1996 births
Living people
American soccer players
Real Monarchs players
Kitsap Pumas players
Association football midfielders
Soccer players from Nevada
USL League Two players
USL Championship players